Bernhard Rammerstorfer (born 1968) is an Austrian author and film director. His book Unbroken Will is a biography of the Austrian Jehovah's Witness and Holocaust survivor Leopold Engleitner. He later made a documentary film with the same title. His 2012 documentary Ladder in the Lions' Den, made with A. Ferenc Gutai, received a special jury mention at the online European International Film Festival in 2016, and took second place in the "Best Festival Film" category and won the "Best Documentary Film Award" at the Switzerland International Film Festival in 2018.

Bernhard Rammerstorfer is an Austrian award winning filmmaker and author who has produced a number of films and publications relating to National Socialism that have been released in various languages in Austria, Germany, Italy, France, Croatia, Spain, the Russian Federation, and the United States of America. He has given lectures at schools, universities and memorial sites in Europe and the USA, including Dresden University, Vienna University, Boston College, Columbia University, Georgetown University, Harvard University, Stanford University, Pepperdine University, University of Connecticut, and UCLA.
His meticulous pursuit of historical accuracy has earned the respect of fellow researchers and historians. With several film festival awards, and the acclaim of more than 2,000 news articles, online media, TV and radio stations around the globe, the public has rendered homage to his relentlessly passionate drive to be the calm, ordinary, yet powerful voice of those of underserved persecution.
Rammerstorfer is the author of UNBROKEN WILL about concentration camp survivor Leopold Engleitner and is the producer of the documentary film of the same title. He also produced the documentaries UNBROKEN WILL CAPTIVATES THE US, UNBROKEN WILL USA TOUR, and the award-winning documentaries LADDER in the LIONS' DEN and TAKING THE STAND, which received 25 honors and awards from film festivals in the US and internationally (Asia, Canada, Europe, Russia).

In 2012 Bernhard Rammerstorfer produced with A. Ferenc Gutai the multi-award winning documentary film "LADDER in the LIONS' DEN – Freedom Is a Choice, Nazi Concentration Camp Survivor Leopold Engleitner: A 107-Year-Old Eyewitness Tells His Story."  The USA premiere took place at Laemmle's Town Center 5 Theatre in Encino, Los Angeles County, in November 2012 with Leopold Engleitner present. The German version, "LEITER in der LÖWENGRUBE", was released in Austria in March 2013. In April 2013 the film was awarded "Best Documentary Short" by the Fallbrook International Film Festival 2013, of Fallbrook, California, and "Best Short Documentary" by the Rincòn International Film Festival 2013, of Rincòn, Puerto Rico.

Rammerstorfer also produced the documentary Unbroken Will USA Tour, relating to the 2006 US tour, which was premiered in the USA at the Laemmle's Sunset 5 Theatre, West Hollywood, in 2009.

The 2016 award-winning documentary "TAKING THE STAND" also features Engleitner.

References

Further reading 
 "107-Year-Old Holocaust Survivor Dies", Encino-Tarzana Patch, May 8, 2013,

External links
 Bernhard Rammerstorfer
 Facebook Bernhard Rammerstorfer
 Taking the Stand: We Have More to Say
 Austrian Holocaust Memorial Service
 Film "Ladder in the Lions' Den" (2012) - IMDB
 Film "Taking the Stand: We Have More to Say" (2016) - IMDB
 European International Film Festival 2017
 Switzerland International Film Festival 2018
 [https://filmfreeway.com/projects/404601

Austrian male writers
Austrian film producers
1968 births
Living people